Tank (stylized as TANK) is the name of two British heavy metal bands, both of which stem from a band formed in 1980 by Algy Ward, a former member of The Damned. The original band is known as part of the new wave of British heavy metal movement. Tank was often compared to Motörhead as both bands were trios fronted by singing bassists, and played a loose, almost punk-styled metal music with often colourful lyrics.

After legal and creative disputes, Algy Ward led one version of the group while guitarists Mick Tucker and Cliff Evans led the other.

History

Their 1982 debut album, Filth Hounds of Hades, was positively received by both punk and metal fans as well as most critics, regarded now as one of the best albums of the NWOBHM movement. AllMusic critic, Eduardo Rivadavia; described it as "Tank's best album ever, and qualifying it as an essential item in the record collection of any serious '80s metal fan."

As was the case with many other bands of the era, Tank was never able to build on the promise shown by their first album. The band continued on for years through lineup changes and waning commercial fortunes before finally disbanding in 1989. Ward resurrected the band in 1997 playing tour dates around Europe and Japan for a couple of years. A new album, Still At War, emerged in 2002. In August 2006, Ward reported that he was putting the finishing touches on the demos for the next Tank album, Sturmpanzer.

On 20 December 2008, a new lineup was announced. Guitarists Mick Tucker and Cliff Evans were joined by original drummer Mark Brabbs and former Bruce Dickinson bassist Chris Dale. Algy Ward was replaced by former Rainbow singer Doogie White. For 2010, the band replaced Brabbs with Voodoo Six drummer, Dave Cavill and released the new Tank album War Machine, with this lineup in released in October 2010. For 2011, the band replaced Cavill with heavy metal drummer, Mark Cross.

In February 2012, the band announced their first live DVD recorded the previous summer in Poland with additional footage to be recorded in March 2012. The band also released details of the return of former drummer, Steve Hopgood, along with details of the forthcoming album, War Nation. The album was released on 4 June on Metal Mind Productions, produced by Phil Kinman at his west London studios.

In 2013, it emerged that Algy Ward has resurrected his own version of the band, with all tracks on a new album called Breath of the Pit being "written, played and shouted" by Ward himself. According to Algy Ward, Sturmpanzer was to be released sometime in 2015. Tank led by Tucker/Evans was scheduled to release their third album that year as well. The album, called Valley of Tears, was scheduled to be released on 9 June, but was pushed back to 18 September.

In January 2016, Ward stated that Sturmpanzer was finished and would be finally released in early 2016. However, it was later delayed, and finally released in November 2018.

In June 2019, the Tucker-Evans Tank embarked on their debut Australian tour (the first visit of Tank in general to the country), co-headlining with Girlschool and Raven, after Venom Inc. had to pull out due to health reasons.

Discography

Tank

Albums
Filth Hounds of Hades (1982)
Power of the Hunter (1982)
This Means War (1983)
Honour & Blood (1984)
Tank (1987)
Still at War (2002)

Singles
"Don't Walk Away" (1981)
"(He Fell in Love with a) Stormtrooper" (1982)
"Turn Your Head Around" (1982)
"Crazy Horses" (1982)
"Echos of a Distant Battle" (1983)

Compilation and live albums
Armour Plated (1985)
The Return of the Filth Hounds Live (1998)
War of Attrition (live '81) (2001)
The Filth Hounds of Hades - Dogs of War 1981–2002 (2007)

Tucker/Evans Tank

Albums
War Machine (2010)
War Nation (2012)
Valley of Tears (2015)
Re-Ignition (2019)

Algy Ward's Tank

Albums
Breath of the Pit (2013)
Sturmpanzer (2018)

Members

Current members
Algy Ward's Tank
Algy Ward (1980–1989, 1997–2008, 2013–present) – vocals, all instruments (2013–present); vocals, bass (1980–1989, 1997–2008)

Tucker/Evans's Tank
Mick Tucker (1983–1989, 1997–present) – guitar
Cliff Evans (1984–1989, 1997–present) – guitar
Bobby Schottkowski (2014–present) – drums
David Readman (2017–present) – vocals
Randy van der Elsen (2017–present) – bass

Previous members 

Peter Brabbs (1980–1983) – guitar
Mark Brabbs (1980–1983, 2009) – drums
Graeme Crallan (1984–1985; died 2008) – drums
Michael Bettel (1985; died 2003) – drums
Gary Taylor (1985–1989) – drums
Steve Clarke (1989) – drums

Steve Hopgood (1997–2001, 2012–2014) – drums
Bruce Bisland (2001–2007) – drums
Dave "Grav" Cavill (2008–2011) – drums
Mark Cross (2011–2012) – drums
Doogie White (2008–2014) – vocals
Chris Dale (2008–2014) – bass
ZP Theart (2013–2017) – vocals (2014–2017), live vocals (2013–2014) (as touring member)
Barend Courbois (2014–2017) – bass

Timeline

See also
New wave of British heavy metal
List of new wave of British heavy metal bands

References

External links
Algy Ward's Tank
Tucker/Evans Tank

English heavy metal musical groups
Musical groups established in 1980
Musical groups disestablished in 1989
Musical groups reestablished in 1997
Musical groups from London
New Wave of British Heavy Metal musical groups